Odd job or Oddjob may refer to:

Entertainment
Oddjob, a James Bond villain
Oddjob (comics), a comic book series
Oddjobs, a music group
Odd Jobs (1986 film), an American comedy film
Odd Jobs (1997 film), an American TV movie
Odd Job (film), a 2016 film
The Odd Job, a 1978 comedy film
"Odd Jobs" (The Fairly OddParents episode)

Other uses
Handyman, work
Stanley Odd Jobs, a tool produced by Stanley Works from 1888 to the 1930s
OddJob (Trojan horse), a computer security malware
Odd Job Trading, a retail closeout store which folded in the early 2000s